Baron Gorell, of Brampton in the County of Derby, is a title in the Peerage of the United Kingdom. It was created on 16 February 1909 for Sir Gorell Barnes, President of the Probate, Divorce and Admiralty Division of the High Court of Justice from 1905 to 1909. His eldest son, the second Baron, was killed in the First World War and was succeeded by his younger brother, the third Baron. He notably served as Under-Secretary of State for Air between 1921 and 1922 in the coalition government of David Lloyd George. He was succeeded by his son, the fourth Baron. He was a Senior Executive of the Royal Dutch/Shell Group from 1959 to 1984.  the title is held by his nephew, the fifth Baron, who succeeded in 2007. He is the son of the Hon. Ronald Alexander Henry Barnes.

Baron Gorell (1909)
(John) Gorell Barnes, 1st Baron Gorell (1848–1913)
Henry Gorell Barnes, 2nd Baron Gorell (1882–1917)
Ronald Gorell Barnes, 3rd Baron Gorell (1884–1963)
Timothy John Radcliffe Barnes, 4th Baron Gorell (1927–2007)
John Picton Gorell Barnes, 5th Baron Gorell (b. 1959)

The heir apparent is the present holder's son, the Hon. Oliver Gorell Barnes (b. 1993).

Male-line family tree

References

External sources

Kidd, Charles, Williamson, David (editors). Debrett's Peerage and Baronetage (1990 edition). New York: St Martin's Press, 1990.

Baronies in the Peerage of the United Kingdom
Noble titles created in 1909